Fantasia: Music Evolved is a 2014 motion-controlled music rhythm game developed by Harmonix for the Xbox 360 and Xbox One with Kinect. The game is the interactive successor to Walt Disney's 1940 animated film Fantasia and its 1999 sequel Fantasia 2000, both of which it is based upon.

Plot 
At the start of the game, the guide, Percy, tells the player that they are embarking on a musical journey. When they finish their training as Apprentices and complete the first songs required to place the stars in the Sorcerer's hat, Yen Sid then bestows the player the Sorcerer's Hat and the takes the player to meet the second supporting character, Scout, who needs help conducting music. After helping Scout to conduct music, she suggests to go back to Observatory, where Yen Sid resides, but he is absent and the player finds out that the force called the Noise had disrupted the realms. It is up to the player to restore the realms to their glory by completing goals of discovering remixes in songs in each realm, and participate in music making minigames in each realm (e.g.: moving the hand at certain objects to make music notes).

Gameplay 
The narration directly references the "Sorcerer's Apprentice" segment from Walt Disney's 1940 animated film Fantasia. The sorcerer Yen Sid tasks his new apprentice, the player, with animating the worlds he has created. Players generate life in initially desolate levels by moving in rhythm with licensed popular and classical music, which unlocks gestures that change elements of the musical composition. In an example, a player traced arrows with her body in time with a song, and was rewarded with a selection of rock, orchestral, and brass music overlays that fit over the song. The Kinect shows the player as an on-screen silhouette, which transforms other objects when the two touch. The game is able to read nuance in the player's body movements and change the visual animations accordingly.

Fantasia: Music Evolved is designed to emphasize creative control, although with that in mind, players are able to score points based on how accurate they are in time with the music, and also build up a streak and a multiplier by switching tracks, and opening up composition spells for even more points. The player is unable to fail or lose the game, although they are able to complete goals.  After completing a level, some musical elements are exported to the overworld. Players collect magical energy while playing, which is used to unlock items that can be brought into the levels, and can also unlock additional mixes mid-song by completing certain goals.

Players are able to share their final, saved mixes on the game's official YouTube channel after the levels are complete. There is also a two-player Co-op mode. Unlocked songs in story mode with their respective remixes, goals, composition spells, and realms become available in the song library, while party mode enables access to all available songs, although song-based goals cannot be completed.

Development 
Disney Interactive Studios first contacted Harmonix with the idea in 2010. The Harmonix team was invigorated from the success of its Dance Central and brainstormed about further intersections between motion control and music. Harmonix was not open to Disney's offer to meet at first since the team did not traditionally use third-party intellectual property. At the meeting, there was an instant connection when Disney mentioned Fantasia, since the brand connected with Harmonix's projects in development. Disney and Harmonix wanted a game more interactive for the player than simply participating in the actions of the film, so the Harmonix team began planning from Walt Disney's original intentions via his production notes instead of from the final film release. Disney Interactive Studios executive producer Chris Nicholls met with the Harmonix team to establish core principles upon which to base the game. The development team liked the "Sorcerer's Apprentice" dream sequence scene best, where Mickey controlled the weather and background orchestra like a conductor from atop a mountain. Its "reaching out" interaction is reflected in the gameplay. This scene, where "magic and the manipulation of music itself were woven into a single act", became a central narrative conceit and "creative inception point" for the team. While visiting the Disney creative teams, the Harmonix team was also inspired by Disneyland's World of Color show.

Fantasia: Music Evolved was unveiled at a press event just prior to Electronic Entertainment Expo 2013 as a modern update of Walt Disney's Fantasia. The game was designed as an interactive successor to the film. The team aimed to contemporize the film by connecting physical movement with music. They chose to emphasize freedom of choice instead of themes from their previous games such as imitation and scores based on performance. Harmonix co-founder and CEO Alex Rigopulos has called this evolution into "musical creativity" a long-term interest of the company, as well as its "creative responsibility". Project lead Daniel Sussman differentiated the game from previous Harmonix releases and added that the team was "trying to make something accessible and creative". The game is designed to read nuance in player gestures to afford for greater creativity. Harmonix also wanted the game to be a tool for making music similar to the experience of musicians. The team spent a long portion of its development period iterating through experiments before settling on the final combination of gameplay and creative elements.

Harmonix's CEO affirmed that the team was excited about the innovative aspects of the game, specifically its options for creativity. At the time of the game's announcement, creative director Matt Boch compared the creative spirit and innovation of the Fantasia film's team to that of the Harmonix staff. While internally testing the game, the team competed to perform the "craziest" performance of the songs. Disney and Harmonix have brainstormed about a theme park adaptation of the game as a future possibility.

The game was released for the Xbox 360 and Xbox One Kinect. Harmonix released plans for downloadable content (DLC), including additional music tracks and other game elements.

There is also another sorcerer named Scout, who acts as the game's guide, and helps the player fight off a force called the Noise, a force that brings distortion to the realms of the entire gameplay. Scout helps players learn how to remix music and restore music to each realm.

Music 
Songs from more than 30 artists are included in the game, and each song (except for one) is accompanied by 3 colour-coded mixes (Blue, Pink, and Green) with an optional fourth mix that's available as part of each expansion pack, 2 of the default on-disc mixes varies by the song, but can be customized before the song is played. "Bohemian Rhapsody", for example, has the original, an orchestral composition, a Metal mix, and a remix by Fort Knox Five. In keeping with the films, the licensed music includes compositions from the classical era, including Night on Bald Mountain by Modest Mussorgsky that is a feature piece of the original Fantasia film. The span of music is a first for Harmonix, and represents a fusion of music genres across music history. Classical pieces are highlighted Italic and any other genre of songs are highlighted regular. There are thirty three songs in this game.

The original score for the game was written by Inon Zur, who also produced and orchestrated many other tracks in the game. The official soundtrack, consisting of Zur's original music along with all of the classical pieces featured in the game, was released on October 21, 2014. An extended director's cut, featuring exclusive tracks including remixes, was also made available exclusively on Skill Tree Records' website.

Downloadable content 
In addition to the on-disc setlist, there is also downloadable content which consists of 18 songs and three remix expansion packs. Three of the DLC songs are available as a pre-order bonus with retail copies of the game. The three remix packs are included with pre-orders of the either the standard digital copy or the digital deluxe copy of the game on Xbox One. The digital deluxe bundle on Xbox One included immediate access to all DLC for the game, which included all 18 songs and three remix packs. Those who purchase the standard digital bundle or the retail disc did not have early access to the DLC and would have to wait for each track to become available before purchasing. Purchasing all of the DLC individually would cost approximately $48 in total.

Remix Expansion Packs 
The remix expansion packs are included with both digital versions of the game on Xbox One and Xbox 360. These expansion packs do not provide new songs, instead they provide additional remixes for the on-disc songs.

Dance Expansion Pack 
 "Get Ur Freak On" - Missy Elliott
 "In Your Eyes" - Peter Gabriel
 "Rocket Man (I Think It's Going to Be a Long, Long Time)" - Elton John
 "Some Nights" - Fun
 "Take Care" - Drake (feat. Rihanna)
 "The Real Me" - The Who

Pop Expansion Pack 
 "Blue Monday" - New Order
 "Bohemian Rhapsody" - Queen
 "Forget You" - Cee Lo Green
 "Levels" - AVICII
 "Seven Nation Army" - The White Stripes
 "Super Bass" - Nicki Minaj

Rock Expansion Pack 
 "Applause" - Lady Gaga
 "Feel Good Inc." - Gorillaz
 "Galang" - M.I.A.
 "Locked Out of Heaven" - Bruno Mars
 "Message in a Bottle" - The Police
 "Royals" - Lorde

Reception

Fantasia: Music Evolved received positive reviews. It received an aggregated score of 77/100 on Metacritic based on 48 reviews.

Kevin VanOrd of GameSpot described the game as "overflowing with charm" and that it "makes me feel like a graceful performance artist, a skillful sorcerer, and a master musician all at once".

Miranda Sanchez, writing for IGN, said the game "provides a surprising amount of control and personalization options over each song, which is paired with fun gameplay to bring a fresh new style to the music game genre".

Susan Arendt from Joystiq gave the game an 8/10, praising its animation, distinct personalities among different locales, and remixed songs which have extended the lifespan of each song, as well as the Kinect control. However, she criticized the composition spells, as she stated that the feature needlessly interrupts the core rhythm game.

Ashley Reed from GamesRadar gave the game an 8/10, praising the wide range of songs and remixes, but criticizing the forgettable levels, weak story, as well as persistent issues detecting certain movements.

Steve Hannley from Hardcore Gamer gave the game a 4/5, commending the visuals, remix quality and Kinect interaction.

Chris Carter from Destructoid praised the rewarding and solid gameplay, flexible, intuitive control, as well as an in-game mechanic which allow players to change up the theme dynamically.

Griffin McElroy from Polygon gave the game a 7/10, praising its core mechanics as well as the sense of ownership over music delivered, but criticizing the unnecessary unlock system, lack of difficulty setting and exhausting gameplay.

References

External links

2014 video games
Video games based on films
Fantasia (franchise)
Fantasy video games
Works based on The Sorcerer's Apprentice
Kinect games
Mickey Mouse video games
Music video games
Video games scored by Inon Zur
Video games developed in the United States
Xbox 360 games
Xbox One games
Harmonix games
Multiplayer and single-player video games